Al-maẓālim (injustices, grievances) were an ancient pre-Islamic institution that was adopted by the Abbasids in the eighth century CE. The main purpose of the mazalim courts was to give ordinary people redress. Mazalim, or the sultan's court, was distinguished from the shurṭa, police courts.

References

Islamic terminology
Arabic words and phrases in Sharia
Government of the Abbasid Caliphate

Bibliography
 Tyan, Emile. Histoire de l'organisation judiciaire en pays d'Islam. Leiden: Brill, 1960.
 Nielsen, Jorgen. Secular Justice in an Islamic State: Maẓālim under the Baḥrī Mamlūks, 662/1264-789/1387. Leiden: Nederlands Historisch-Archaeologisch Instituut te Istanbul, 1985.
 Tillier, Mathieu. Qādī-s and the political use of the mazālim jurisdiction under the ʿAbbāsids. In Maribel Fierro and Christian Lange (eds.), Public Violence in Islamic Societies: Power, Discipline, and the Construction of the Public Sphere, 7th-18th Centuries CE. Edinburgh: Edinburgh University Press, 2009, . Online: http://hal.archives-ouvertes.fr/docs/00/61/38/82/PDF/Tillier-Mazalim-Epreuves.pdf
Tillier, Mathieu. The Maẓālim in Historiography. In A.M. Emon and R. Ahmed (eds.), Oxford Handbook of Islamic Law. Oxford: Oxford University Press, 2018, p. 357-380. 
 van Berkel, Maaike. Embezzlement and reimbursement. Disciplining officials in ‘Abbāsid Baghdad (8th-10th centuries A.D.). International Journal of Public Administration, 34 (2011), .